Anthony Hugh Selormey is a Ghanaian soldier and politician. He was one of the members of the National Redemption Council (NRC) which overthrew the Progress Party government of Kofi Abrefa Busia on 13 January 1972. He also served briefly in the Supreme Military Council government which followed the NRC.

Early life and education
Selormey was born at Dzelukope, a town near Keta in the Volta Region. His secondary education was at the Bishop Herman College at Kpandu in the Volta Region where he graduated in 1958.

Military career
In 1961, he entered the Ghana Military Academy at Teshie, near Accra and was commissioned into the Ghana Army in April 1962. He attended the Royal Armoured Corps Centre at Bovington Camp in the United Kingdom. He is reported to be the first Ghanaian soldier to undergo tank warfare training at the Armour School, Fort Knox, United States in 1967. He also did other military courses at the United States Intelligence School.

He later became an instructor at the Ghana Military Academy at Teshie for three years. He rose to the rank of Major and served as the Second in Command of the Armoured Reconnaissance Regiment prior to the coup d'état in January 1972.

Politics
Selormey is believed to be one of the core planners of the 13 January coup. Together with him were Major K. B. Agbo and Major Kwame Baah. He became the Commissioner for Information following the coup. Later that year, he was appointed Commissioner for Transport and Communications. In May 1975, he was appointed the Commissioner for Health. He continued briefly in this capacity until the National Redemption Council was replaced by the Supreme Military Council in October 1975. He was promoted to the rank of colonel at the same time.

See also
National Redemption Council.
Supreme Military Council, Ghana

References

1937 births
Living people
Ewe people
Ghana Army personnel
Health ministers of Ghana
Bishop Herman College alumni
Information ministers of Ghana
People from Volta Region
Transport ministers of Ghana